Defford is a small village in the county  of Worcestershire, England, located between the towns of Pershore and Upton-upon-Severn. It was once part of the Royal forest of Horewell. The woodlands were mostly removed around the time of the Civil War.

Defford also has a primary school, Defford cum Besford First School, and three pubs.

Defford is home to one of the radio telescopes that make up the Jodrell Bank MERLIN (Multi-Element Radio Linked Interferometer Network) radio telescope array linking six observing stations that together form a powerful telescope with an effective aperture of over 217 kilometres.

Defford Village Hall
The village hall is owned and run by a charity, the Defford Village Hall Trust, and managed by a committee of trustees .
In 2011 the new village hall was built on a greenfield site some 50 yards to the south west of the old hall, adjacent to the car park.
The hall was designed by a Defford resident and trustee, David Bakefield, who was instrumental in bringing the project to fruition.
It has become the focal point of village life, well used by local clubs and societies.

Defford airfield

In 1941 during World War II, a Royal Air Force airfield was constructed mainly  for the flying  experiments for radar that  was being  developed in  nearby  Malvern.   For a few months the airfield was used as a satellite station by the Wellington bomber training unit located at  RAF Pershore.

A small grass airstrip remains on the now disused airfield that has been used as a location for telecommunications installations.  The site is now owned and used by the West Mercia Constabulary, but the central part of the  airfield still houses a Satellite Communications facility now operated by QinetiQ.

Village hall reconstruction

External links

 Defford air field
 Defford church
 Former rail station
 Photos of Defford and surrounding area from Geograph.co.uk
 Merlin
 New village hall site plan
 New village hall elevations

References

Villages in Worcestershire
Earth stations in England